Information Management Software is one of the brands within IBM Software Group (SWG) division. The major Information Management products include:

 IBM Db2 — relational database management system (RDBMS)
 Informix Dynamic Server — high-throughput database server for online transaction processing (OLTP)
 Cloudscape — embedded RDBMS for Java
 Information Management System (IMS) — hierarchical database and information management system
 OmniFind — search and text analytics software
 Enterprise Content Management — IBM services for managing content, optimizing business processes and enabling compliance
 pureQuery - data access platform
 IBM RFID Information Center (RFIDIC) - Tracking and tracing products through global supply chains
 IBM InfoSphere DataStage - an ETL tool
 InfoSphere Guardium – Real-time database security and monitoring application to safeguard enterprise data (SAP, PeopleSoft, etc.) and address regulatory compliance requirements

References

External links
 IBM Information Management Software home page
 IBM Information Management Software Redbooks
 IBM Enterprise Content Management Software home page

Information Management Software